Henry Ernest of Stolberg-Wernigerode (7 December 1716, Wernigerode – 24 October 1778, Halberstadt) was a German politician, canon, dean and author of many hymns. He also published some poetry and collections of songs. He was Count of Stolberg-Wernigerode from 1771 until his death.

Life 
Henry Ernest was the eldest surviving son of Count Christian Ernest of Stolberg-Wernigerode. His mother, Countess Sophie Charlotte of Leiningen-Westerburg, was heavily influenced by Pietism and raised her son in this spirit. Henry Ernest studied at the universities in Halle and Göttingen and, already in 1739, he received a prebend at the cathedral chapter at Halberstadt; this appointment was confirmed by King Frederick II of Prussia. Also in 1739, he was awarded the Order of the Dannebrog by King Christian VI of Denmark.

His father involved him in the ruling of the county from a young age and after 1742 he consistently attended meetings of the Chamber of Wernigerode. He was involved, for example, in the development of the peat industry on Mount Brocken, in 1743 establishing a peat works on the Brocken named Heinrichshöhe.

During his father's lifetime he enlarged the hymnology department of the count's library, and collected and composed himself almost 400 hymns. He also supported the popular poet Anna Louisa Karsch. In 1763 he had Johann Georg Ziesenis make him a painting showing King Frederick II of Prussia down to the knee.

After his father's death on 25 October 1771, the 55-year-old Henry Ernest took up the government in the county of Wernigerode, where he promoted the most pietistic form of religious life.

Marriage and issue 
Henry Ernest was married on 11 December 1738 in Sorau to Marie Elizabeth, daughter of Count Erdmann II of Promnitz. She died on 29 July 1741 in Wernigerode as a result of the birth of their second daughter.
 Charlotte Auguste (9 October 174020 September 1741)
 Daughter (1741–1741)

After a year of mourning, he was married a second time, in Köthen, to Princess Christiane Anna of Anhalt-Köthen, daughter of Prince Augustus Louis and his second wife, Countess Emilie of Promnitz (making her a niece of his first wife). His son and heir was born from this marriage:
 Christian Frederick (1746–1824)
 married Auguste Eleonore of Stolberg-Stolberg (1748–1821)
 Auguste Friederike (4 September 17439 January 1783)
 married firstly on 5 December 1767 to Gustav Frederick of Isenburg-Büdingen (7 August 171512 February 1768)
 married secondly on 24 September 1768 to Louis Casimir of Isenburg-Büdingen (25 August 171015 December 1775)
 married thirdly on 26 June 1777 to Friedrich von Wendt (died 24 September 1818)
 Louise Ferdinand (30 September 17443 February 1784)
 married on 13 June 1766 to Frederick Erdmann, Prince of Anhalt-Pless (1731–1797)

Works 
 Religious Poems, edited by Siegmund Jakob Baumgarten, 4 vols, Halle, 1748-52.
 Der sel. u. sichere Glaubensweg eines ev. Christen in gebundene Rede gebracht, Wernigerode 1747
 Neue Sammlung geistlicher Lieder, Wernigerode, 1752 [editor], including his song: Fort, fort, mein Herz, du mußt stets aufwärts steigen

References and sources

External links 
 portrait of Henry Ernest of Stolberg-Wernigerode in the Gleimhaus in Halberstadt

1716 births
1778 deaths
18th-century German people
Henry Ernest
German Protestant hymnwriters
German poets
German politicians
Henry Ernest Von Stolberg-Wernigerode
Order of the Dannebrog
People from Wernigerode
German landowners